No Man's Range is a 1935 American Western film directed by Robert N. Bradbury.

Plot summary

Cast 
Bob Steele as Jim Hale
Roberta Gale as Helen Green
Buck Connors as Fuzz
Steve Clark as Ed Brady
Charles K. French as Ed Oliver
Jack Rockwell as Sheriff
Roger Williams as Henchman Pete
Earl Dwire as Phony Ed Oliver

Soundtrack 
 Jack Kirk - "No Man's Range (When Evening Shadows Fall)"

See also 
Bob Steele filmography

External links 

1935 films
American Western (genre) films
1930s English-language films
American black-and-white films
Films directed by Robert N. Bradbury
1935 Western (genre) films
1930s American films